The fifth season of the historical drama television series Vikings premiered on November 29, 2017 on History in Canada. The series broadly follows the exploits of the legendary Viking chieftain Ragnar Lothbrok and his crew, and later those of his sons. 

The fifth season consists of a double-season order of twenty episodes, split into two parts of ten episodes; the first part concluded on January 24, 2018. The second half premiered on November 28, 2018. The premise of the fifth season differs from the previous four after the departure of Travis Fimmel as Ragnar, and it follows the adventures of his living sons. Jonathan Rhys Meyers is introduced as a main character, after his initial appearance in the fourth season's finale. The season concluded in its entirety on January 30, 2019.

Cast

Main
 Katheryn Winnick as Queen Lagertha, a shield-maiden and Ragnar's ex-wife; she is the queen of Kattegat.
 Gustaf Skarsgård as Floki, a gifted shipbuilder
 Alexander Ludwig as Bjorn Ironside, Ragnar and Lagertha's son and Torvi's husband
 Peter Franzén as King Harald Finehair, a Viking ambitious to become the first King of Norway
 Jasper Pääkkönen as Halfdan the Black, Harald's violent younger brother (part 1)
 Moe Dunford as King Aethelwulf of Wessex (part 1)
 Alex Høgh as King Ivar the Boneless, fourth son of Ragnar and Aslaug; he becomes king of Kattegat.
 Marco Ilsø as Hvitserk, second son of Ragnar and Aslaug
 Jordan Patrick Smith as Ubbe, eldest son of Ragnar and Aslaug
 Jonathan Rhys Meyers as Bishop Heahmund, a Christian warrior priest
 John Kavanagh as The Seer, the seiðrmann of Kattegat

Special appearances by
 Clive Standen as Duke Rollo, a warrior and Ragnar's brother; he was granted the title of Duke of Normandy by Emperor Charles.

Three main characters who died in previous seasons briefly appear played by body doubles: Sigurd's corpse is briefly shown in "The Fisher King", King Ecbert appears in "The Fisher King" as a corpse and in "Baldur" as a cloaked figure, and Athelstan is seen as a cloaked figure in "The Departed".

Recurring

 Josefin Asplund as Queen Astrid, Lagertha's lover and, later King Harald's wife
 Ida Marie Nielsen as Margrethe, Ubbe's wife
 Ferdia Walsh-Peelo as Prince/King Alfred, Queen Judith and Athelstan's son
 Georgia Hirst as Torvi, wife of Bjorn and, later, wife of Ubbe
 Jennie Jacques as Queen Judith of Northumbria, daughter of King Aelle, wedded to King Aethelwulf
 Jonathan Delaney Tynan as Lord/Bishop Cuthred, a nobleman of Wessex and, later, Bishop of Sherborne
 Keith McErlean as Lord Denewulf, a nobleman in service of Bishop Heahmund
 Darren Cahill as Prince Aethelred, Queen Judith and King Aethelwulf's son
 Ben Roe as Guthrum, Jarl Borg and Torvi's son
 Kieran O'Reilly as White Hair, Ivar's chief bodyguard
 Frankie McCafferty as Sindric, a polyglot drifter
 Alicia Agneson as Queen Freydis, Ivar's former slave, love interest and, later, queen of Kattegat
 Albano Jerónimo as Euphemius, a Byzantine commander
 Karima McAdams as Kassia, a Byzantine abbess
 Paul Reid as Mannel, Queen Judith's cousin and Princess Elsewith's father
 Khaled Abol Naga as Emir Ziyadat Allah, an Arab ruler
 Adam Copeland as Kjetill Flatnose (/ʃjetil/), a violent and bold warrior who joins Floki's expedition to set up a colony
 Kris Holden-Ried as Eyvind (/eɪvɪnd/), a Viking of Kattegat who also joins Floki's expedition
 Leah McNamara as Aud the Deep-Minded (/eɪθ/), Kjetill Flatnose and Ingvild's daughter
 Jack McEvoy as Helgi the Lean, Eyvind and Rafarta's son, who is married to Thorunn
 Mei Bignall as Thorunn, Kjetill Flatnose and Ingvild's daughter and Helgi's wife
 Kelly Campbell as Ingvild, Kjetill Flatnose's wife
 James Craze as Bul, Eyvind and Rafarta's son
 Elijah Rowen as Asbjorn, Eyvind and Rafarta's son
 Donna Dent as Rafarta, Eyvind's wife
 Rob Malone as Thorgrim, Kjetill Flatnose and Ingvild's son
 Scott Graham as Frodi, Kjetill Flatnose and Ingvild's son
 Tallulah Belle Earley as Jorunn, Eyvind and Rafarta's daughter
 Ryan Henson as Hali, Bjorn and Torvi's son
 Svea Killoran as Asa, Bjorn and Torvi's daughter
 Anthony Brophy as King Svase, a Sami chief and an ally of Lagertha
 Dagny Backer Johnsen as Princess Snæfrid, Svase's daughter
 Malcolm Douglas as Lord Cyneheard, a nobleman of Wessex
 Róisín Murphy as Princess/Queen Elsewith, Mannel's daughter and King Alfred's wife
 Damien Devaney as Wilfred, a nobleman and Princess Elsewith's steward
 Dean Ridge as Magnus, Queen Kwenthrith's son and alleged son of Ragnar
 Tomi May as Jarl Olavsonn, Ivar's commander in York
 Ragga Ragnars as Gunnhild, Olavsonn's wife and, later, Bjorn's wife
 Eve Connolly as Thora, Hvitserk's love interest
 Ann Skelly as Lady Ethelfled, Lord Cuthred's daughter and Prince Aethelred's wife
 Steven Berkoff as King Olaf the Stout, a Norwegian king
 Erik Madsen as King Hemming, a leader of the Black Danes confederation
 Markjan Winnick as King Angantyr, a leader of the Black Danes confederation
 Gavan Ó Connor Duffy as King Frodo, a leader of the Black Danes confederation
 Kristy Dawn Dinsmore as Amma, a shield-maiden in Harald's army

Guest
 India Mullen as Aethegyth, a noblewoman of Wessex
 Frank Prendergast as Bishop Cynebert of York
 Laurence O'Fuarain as Hakon, a whale hunter of Vestfold
 Bosco Hogan as Lord Abbot of Lindisfarne
 Mabel Hurley as young Lagertha, appearing in a flashback
 Ross Matthew Anderson as Lagertha's father, appearing in a flashback
 Ben McKeown as Crowbone, a Viking warrior at York
 Conn Rogers as Canute, a member of King Olaf's court
 Jamie Maclachlan as Aldwin, a Saxon commander
 Martin Maloney as Vigrid, one of Ivar's men

Episodes

 Notes

Production

Development
An Irish-Canadian co-production presented by Metro-Goldwyn-Mayer, the fifth season of Vikings was developed and produced by TM Productions and Take 5 Productions. Morgan O'Sullivan, Sheila Hockin, Sherry Marsh, Alan Gasmer, James Flynn, John Weber, and Michael Hirst are credited as executive producers. This season was produced by Keith Thompson for the first four and last four episodes, and Liz Gill for the fifth to sixteenth episodes. Bill Goddard and Séamus McInerney are co-producers.

The production team for this season includes casting directors Frank and Nuala Moiselle, costume designer Susan O'Connor Cave, visual effects supervisor Dominic Remane, stunt action designer Richard Ryan, composer Trevor Morris, production designer Mark Geraghty, editors Aaron Marshall for the first, third, fifth, tenth, fourteenth, seventeenth and twentieth episodes, Tad Seaborn for the second, fourth, sixth, eighth, thirteenth, sixteenth and nineteenth episodes, Michele Conroy for the seventh, ninth and eleventh episodes, Dan Briceno for the twelfth episode, and Don Cassidy for the fifteenth and eighteenth episodes and cinematographers PJ Dillon for the first and second episodes, Peter Robertson for the third, fourth, and seventh to sixteenth episodes, Suzie Lavelle for the fifth, sixth, seventeenth and eighteenth episodes, and Owen McPolin for the nineteenth and twentieth episodes.

Casting
At the same time that the series was renewed for a fifth season, it was announced that Irish actor Jonathan Rhys Meyers would be joining the cast, as Heahmund, a "warrior bishop". Vikings creator Michael Hirst, explained: "I was looking at the history books, and I came across these warrior bishops. The antecedents of the Knights Templar: these are people who were absolutely religious, yet they put on armor and they fought. Don't let their priestly status fool you, either. They were crazy! They believed totally in Christianity and the message, and yet, on the battlefield, they were totally berserk."

Former WWE star Adam Copeland was cast in a recurring role for the fifth season, as Kjetill Flatnose, a violent and bold warrior. He is chosen by Floki to join an expedition to set up a colony in a new land. Irish actor Darren Cahill plays the role of Aethelred in the fifth season. Nigerian actor Stanley Amuzie told local media he had landed a small role in the fifth season. The fifth season also includes Irish actor, musician and real-life police detective, Kieran O'Reilly, who plays the role of White Hair. In April 2017 it was announced that Danish actor Erik Madsen had joined the cast for the fifth season, as King Hemming. He spent several months of 2016 on the set of The Last Kingdom, portraying a Viking.

Music

The musical score for the fifth season was composed by Trevor Morris in collaboration with Einar Selvik. The opening sequence is again accompanied by the song "If I Had a Heart" by Fever Ray.

The soundtrack album was released on December 27, 2019 by Sony Classical Records. An additional original song not included in the album is "Skidarima", written and performed by Einar Selvik and featured in "Homeland".

Additional non-original music by Norwegian music group Wardruna is featured in the episodes "The Plan" and "A Simple Story". The featured tracks are "MannaR - Drivande", "Løyndomsriss", and "Heimta Thurs".

Reception

Critical response
The review aggregator website Rotten Tomatoes reported a 91% approval rating, with an average rating of 8.10/10 based on 11 reviews. The consensus reads: "Brutal battles and epic quests help Vikings' fifth season remain an engaging, exciting journey." IGN awarded episode 10, "Moments of Vision", with a rating of 9 out of 10. Entertainent Weekly gave the episode an "A".

The second half of the season drew some criticism.  Writing in Forbes, Erik Kain said: "the show continues to falter, an unfortunate mix of melodrama, one-note characters and absurd fantasy parading as historical fiction" and that the show "has simply lost its way". In "A Simple Story", Aethelred is portrayed rejecting the throne in favour of his younger brother Alfred. In history, after the death of Aethelwulf, three of Alfred's elder brothers ruled, for two, five and six years respectively, all dying before Alfred took the throne in 871. Writing in Forbes, Erik Kain described the storyline as "just a huge unforced error".

References

External links
 
 

2017 Canadian television seasons
2017 Irish television seasons
2018 Canadian television seasons
2018 Irish television seasons
2019 Canadian television seasons
2019 Irish television seasons
Split television seasons
Cultural depictions of Harald Fairhair